Laurencetown railway station was on the Banbridge Junction Railway which ran from Scarva to Banbridge in Northern Ireland.

History

The station was opened on 23 March 1859.

The station closed on 2 May 1955.

References 

Disused railway stations in County Down
Railway stations opened in 1859
Railway stations closed in 1955
1859 establishments in Ireland
1955 disestablishments in Northern Ireland
Railway stations in Northern Ireland opened in the 19th century